Alviks Basketklubb or simply Alvik was a Swedish basketball club based in Alvik, a residential district in western Stockholm Municipality.

History
The club was formed on August 31, 1956 by Erik Bremer and became one of the major basketball powers of the national league until it transformated to professional under the name Basketligan in 1992. In 1994–95 season, Alvik won the last title in its history. In the early 1996–97 season, the club joined forces with KFUM Söder and Stockholm Capitals and they formed a new basketball club the 08 Stockholm Human Rights.

Honours
 Swedish League
 Winners (19): 1962–63, 1963–64, 1964–65, 1965–66, 1966–67, 1967–68, 1969–70, 1970–71, 1971–72, 1973–74, 1974–75, 1975–76, 1976–77, 1978–79, 1980–81, 1981–82, 1982–83, 1985–86, 1994–95

References

External links
Alvik Basket

Basketball teams established in 1956
Basketball teams disestablished in 1996
Defunct basketball teams in Sweden
Sports clubs disestablished in 1996
basketball